The Newfoundland and Labrador Curling Association (NLCA) is the regional governing body for the sport of curling in Newfoundland and Labrador. The association organizes its member clubs into 4 regions: North, Central, East and West.

Provincial championships 
In 2019 the NLCA is hosting ten provincial championships:

 Newfoundland and Labrador Tankard (Men's)
 Newfoundland and Labrador Scotties Tournament of Hearts (Women's)
 Mixed
 Mixed Doubles
 U18 Juniors
 U16 Juniors
 Seniors
 Masters
 Club Championships
 Wheelchair

See also 

 List of curling clubs in Newfoundland and Labrador

References

External links 

 Official Site

Curling governing bodies in Canada
Curling in Newfoundland and Labrador
Sports governing bodies in Newfoundland and Labrador